The largest animal ever to have lived is thought to be the blue whale (Balaenoptera musculus). It is estimated however that this individual could have a mass of 250 tonnes. The title of the longest non-colonial animal is probably held by the lion's mane jellyfish (36.6m / 120 ft).

The African bush elephant (Loxodonta africana) is the largest living land animal. The largest elephant ever recorded was shot in Angola in 1974. This male had a computed weight of 12.25 tonnes.

Heaviest living animals 
The heaviest living animals are all whales. Since no scale can accommodate the whole body of a large whale, most have been weighed by parts.

Heaviest terrestrial animals

The heaviest land animals are all mammals. The African elephant is now listed as two species, the African bush elephant and the African forest elephant, as they are now generally considered to be two separate species.

Vertebrates

Mammals (Mammalia)

The largest land mammal extant today is the African bush elephant. In 2015, a study suggested that one example of the proboscidean Palaeoloxodon namadicus may have been the largest land mammal ever, based on extensive research of fragmentary leg bone fossils from one individual, with a maximum estimated size of 22 tonnes.

Stem-mammals (Synapsida)
However, one study suggested a more conservative weight of 4.87 tonnes to 7.02 tonnes for the adult taxon, with an average body mass of 5.88 tonnes.
Caseasaurs (Caseasauria)
Sphenacodontids (Sphenacodontidae)
The largest members of the genus Dimetrodon were also the world's first fully terrestrial apex predators.
Tappenosaurids (Tappenosauridae)
Therapsids (Therapsida)
The largest carnivorous therapsid was the aforementioned Anteosaurus from what is now South Africa during Middle Permian epoch.

Reptiles (Reptilia)

However, due to the difficulty of trapping and measuring a very large living crocodile, the accuracy of these dimensions has yet to be verified. A specimen named Lolong caught alive in the Philippines in 2011 (died February 2013) was found to have measured  in length.

The Komodo dragon (Varanus komodoensis), also known as the "Komodo monitor", is a large species of lizard found in the Indonesian islands of Komodo, Rinca, Flores, Gili Motang, Nusa kode and Padar.

Largest living reptiles
The following is a list of the largest living reptile species ranked by average weight, which is dominated by the crocodilians. Unlike mammals, birds, or fish, the mass of large reptiles is frequently poorly documented and many are subject to conjecture and estimation.

Dinosaurs (Dinosauria)

Dinosaurs are now extinct, except for birds, which are theropods.

Sauropods (Sauropoda)
The largest dinosaurs, and the largest animals to ever live on land, were the plant-eating, long-necked Sauropoda. The tallest and heaviest sauropod known from a complete skeleton is a specimen of an immature Giraffatitan discovered in Tanzania between 1907 and 1912, now mounted in the Museum für Naturkunde of Berlin.
There were larger sauropods, but they are known only from a few bones. Two other such sauropods include Bruhathkayosaurus and Maraapunisaurus. Both are known only from fragments. Maraapunisaurus might have been approximately 35–40 m long and 80–120 tonnes or more. 
Theropods (Theropoda)
Body mass estimates have reached over 9,500 kg, though other figures, such as Hartman's 2013 estimate of 8,400 kg, have been lower.
Another giant theropod is Spinosaurus aegyptiacus from the mid-Cretaceous of North Africa. Size estimates have been fluctuating far more over the years, with length estimates ranging from 12.6 to 18 m and mass estimates from 7 to 20.9 t. Recent findings favor a length exceeding 15 m  and a body mass of 7.5 tons.
Other contenders known from partial skeletons include Giganotosaurus carolinii (est. 12.2–13.2 m and 6-13.8 tonnes) and Carcharodontosaurus saharicus (est. 12-13.3 m and 6.2-15.1 tonnes).
The largest extant theropod is the common ostrich (see birds, below).
Armored dinosaurs (Thyreophora)
Ornithopods (Ornithopoda)
The largest ornithopods were the hadrosaurids Shantungosaurus, a late Cretaceous dinosaur found in the Shandong Peninsula of China, and Magnapaulia from the late Cretaceous of North America.
Ceratopsians (Ceratopsia)
The largest ceratopsians were Triceratops and its ancestor Eotriceratops from the late Cretaceous of North America.

Birds (Aves)

The largest living bird, a member of the Struthioniformes, is the common ostrich (Struthio camelus), from the plains of Africa. A mass of  has been cited for the common ostrich but no wild ostriches of this weight have been verified. Eggs laid by the ostrich can weigh  and are the largest eggs in the world today.

The largest bird in the fossil record may be the extinct elephant birds (Aepyornithidae) of Madagascar, which were related to the kiwis. The last of the elephant birds became extinct about 300 years ago. Of almost exactly the same upper proportions as the largest elephant birds was Dromornis stirtoni of Australia, part of a 26,000-year-old group called mihirungs of the family Dromornithidae. The tallest carnivorous bird was Kelenken, which could reach 3 to 3.2 meters in height and 220 to 250 kilograms. The tallest bird ever was the giant moa (Dinornis maximus), part of the moa family of New Zealand that went extinct around 1500 AD.

Heaviest living bird species
The following is a list of the heaviest living bird species based on maximum reported or reliable mass, but average weight is also given for comparison. These species are almost all flightless, which allows for these particular birds to have denser bones and heavier bodies. Flightless birds comprise less than 2% of all living bird species.

Amphibians (Amphibia)

The largest living amphibian is the South China giant salamander (Andrias sligoi). Before amniotes became the dominant tetrapods, several giant amphibian proto-tetrapods existed and were certainly the dominant animals in their ecosystems.

Frogs (Anura)

The largest member of the largest order of amphibians is the African goliath frog (Conraua goliath). The largest of the toads, the cane toad (Rhinella marina), is also the second largest member of the frog order. But in more recent studies, animals of this species have been estimated to have grown to at least  (snout-vent length), which is around the size a modern African bullfrog can reach. The family Leptodactylidae, one of the most diverse anuran families, also has some very large members. Most frogs are classified under the suborder Neobatrachia, although nearly 200 species are part of the suborder Mesobatrachia, or ancient frogs.
Caecilians (Gymnophiona)
Salamanders (Urodela)
The recently described reticulated siren of the southeastern United States rivals the hellbender in size, although it is more lean in build.

Fish

Invertebrate chordates

Tunicates (Tunicata)

Entergonas (Enterogona)
Pleurogonas (Pleurogona)
The largest pleurogonas: Pyura pachydermatina . In colour it is off-white or a garish shade of reddish-purple. The stalk is two thirds to three quarters the length of the whole animal which helps distinguish it from certain invasive tunicates not native to New Zealand such as Styela clava and Pyura stolonifera. It is one of the largest species of tunicates and can grow to over a metre (yard) in length.
Aspiraculates (Aspiraculata)
The largest aspiraculates: Oligotrema large and surrounded by six large lobes; the cloacal syphon is small. They live exclusively in deep water and range in size from less than one inch (2 cm) to 2.4 inches (6 cm).

Thaliacea

The largest thaliacean, Pyrosoma atlanticum, is cylindrical and can grow up to 60 cm (2 ft) long and 4–6 cm wide. The constituent zooids form a rigid tube, which may be pale pink, yellowish, or bluish. One end of the tube is narrower and is closed, while the other is open and has a strong diaphragm. The outer surface or test is gelatinised and dimpled with backward-pointing, blunt processes. Along the side of the branchial sac runs the endostyle, which produces mucus filters. Water is moved through the gill slits into the centre of the cylinder by cilia pulsating rhythmically. Plankton and other food particles are caught in mucus filters in the processes as the colony is propelled through the water. P. atlanticum is bioluminescent and can generate a brilliant blue-green light when stimulated.

Doliolida (Doliolida)
The largest doliolida: Doliolida  The doliolid body is small, typically 1–2 cm long, and barrel-shaped; it features two wide siphons, one at the front and the other at the back end, and eight or nine circular muscle strands reminiscent of barrel bands. Like all tunicates, they are filter feeders. They are free-floating; the same forced flow of water through their bodies with which they gather plankton is used for propulsion - not unlike a tiny ramjet engine. Doliolids are capable of quick movement. They have a complicated lifecycle consisting of sexual and asexual generations. They are nearly exclusively tropical animals, although a few species are found as far north as northern California.
Salps (Salpida)
The largest salps: Cyclosalpa bakeri 15cm (6ins) long. There are openings at the anterior and posterior ends of the cylinder which can be opened or closed as needed. The bodies have seven transverse bands of muscle interspersed by white, translucent patches. A stolon grows from near the endostyle (an elongated glandular structure producing mucus for trapping food particles). The stolon is a ribbon-like organ on which a batch of aggregate forms of the animal are produced by budding. The aggregate is the second, colonial form of the salp and is also gelatinous, transparent and flabby. It takes the shape of a radial whorl of individuals up to about 20cm (4in) in diameter.
Larvaceans (Larvacea)
The largest larvaceans: Appendicularia  in body length (excluding the tail).

Cephalochordates (Leptocardii)

The largest lancelet is the European lancelet (Branchiostoma lanceolatum) "primitive fish". It can grow up to 6 cm (2.5 in) long.

Invertebrate non-chordates

Echinoderms (Echinodermata)

Crinoids (Crinoidea)
The genus Metacrinus has a stalk span of  but, due to its bulk and multiple arms, it is heavier than Heliometra. In the past, crinoids grew much larger, and stalk lengths up to  have been found in the fossil record.
Sea urchins and allies (Echinoidea)
Another deep sea species Hygrosoma hoplacantha is only slightly smaller. The largest species found along the North America coast is the Pacific red sea urchin (Mesocentrotus franciscanus) where the shell can reach .
Sea cucumbers (Holothuroidea)
Brittle stars (Ophiuroidea)
The largest known specimen of brittle star is the basket star Astrotoma agassizii. Outside from euryalids, the biggest ophiurid brittle star may be Ophiopsammus maculata (6–7 inches).
Sea stars (Asteroidea)

Flatworms (Platyhelminthes)

Monogenean flatworms (Monogenea)
Flukes (Trematoda)
The largest known species of fluke is Fasciolopsis buski, which most often attacks humans and livestock.
Tapeworms (Cestoda)

Segmented worms (Annelida)
The largest of the segmented worms (including earthworms, leeches, and polychaetes) is the African giant earthworm (Microchaetus rappi). Only the giant Gippsland earthworm, Megascolides australis, and a few giant polychaetes, including the notorious Eunice aphroditois, reach nearly comparable sizes, reaching , respectively.

Ribbon worms (Nemertea)
The largest nemertean is the bootlace worm, Lineus longissimus.

Mollusks (Mollusca)

Both the largest mollusks and the largest of all invertebrates (in terms of mass) are the largest squids. The colossal squid (Mesonychoteuthis hamiltoni) is projected to be the largest invertebrate. In 2007, authorities in New Zealand announced the capture of the largest known colossal squid specimen.

The giant squid (Architeuthis dux) was previously thought to be the largest squid, and while it is less massive and has a smaller mantle than the colossal squid, it may exceed the colossal squid in overall length including tentacles. This specimen is still often cited as the largest invertebrate that has ever been examined. However, no animals approaching this size have been scientifically documented and, according to giant squid expert Steve O'Shea, such lengths were likely achieved by greatly stretching the two tentacles like elastic bands.

Aplacophorans (Aplacophora)
Chitons (Polyplacophora)

Bivalves (Bivalvia)
The largest of the bivalve mollusks is the giant clam, Tridacna gigas. Although even larger sizes have been reported for this passive animal, the top verified size was for a specimen from the Great Barrier Reef. The largest bivalve ever was Platyceramus platinus, a Cretaceous giant that reached an axial length of up to 3 m (nearly 10 ft).
Gastropods (Gastropoda)
The "largest" of this most diverse and successful mollusk class of slugs and snails can be defined in various ways.
Cephalopods (Cephalopoda)
(See Cephalopod size.) While generally much smaller than the giant Architeuthis and Mesonychoteuthis, the largest of the octopuses, the giant Pacific octopus (Enteroctopus dofleini), can grow to be very large. Specimens have been reported up to  but are unverified. A weight of 10 - 50kg is a much more common size.

Roundworms (Nematoda)

Velvet worms (Onychophora)
The largest velvet worm known is Solórzano's velvet worm (Peripatus solorzanoi). An adult female was recorded to have a body length of 22 cm (approximately 8.7 in).

Arthropods (Arthropoda)

Its legs may span .

Arachnids (Arachnida)
Both spiders and scorpions include contenders for the largest arachnids.

Spiders (Araneae)
The largest species of arachnid by length is probably the giant huntsman spider (Heteropoda maxima) of Laos, which in 2008 replaced the Goliath birdeater (Theraphosa blondi) of northern South America as the largest known spider by leg-span. However the most massive arachnids, of comparable dimensions and possibly even greater mass, are the Chaco golden knee (Grammostola pulchripes), and the Brazilian salmon pink (Lasiodora parahybana).
Scorpions (Scorpiones)
Pseudoscorpions (Pseudoscorpiones)

Crustaceans (Crustacea)
It is the only species in the genus Pseudocarcinus. Males reach more than twice the size of females.

Branchiopods (Branchiopoda)
The largest of these primarily freshwater crustaceans is probably Branchinecta gigas, which can reach a length .
Barnacles and allies (Maxillopoda)
The largest species is Pennella balaenopterae, a copepod and ectoparasite specialising in parasitising marine mammals. The maximum size attained is 32 cm (about 13 in).
Ostracods (Ostracoda)
Amphipods, isopods, and allies (Peracarida)
The largest species is the giant isopod (Bathynomus pergiganteus), which can reach a length of 45 cm (18 inches) and a weight of 1.7 kg (3.7 lb).
Remipedes (Remipedia)

Horseshoe crabs (Xiphosura)

Sea spiders (Pycnogonida)

Trilobites (Trilobita)
Some of these extinct marine arthropods exceeded  in length. Fragments of trilobites suggest even larger record sizes.

Myriapods (Myriapoda)
Centipedes (Chilopoda)

Millipedes (Diplopoda)
Two species of millipede both reach a very large size: Archispirostreptus gigas of East Africa and Scaphistostreptus seychellarum, endemic to the Seychelles islands.
Symphylans (Symphyla)

Insects (Insecta)

Insects, a class of Arthropoda, are easily the most numerous class of organisms, with over one million identified species, and probably many undescribed species. The heaviest insect is almost certainly a species of beetle, which incidentally is the most species-rich order of organisms. Although heavyweight giant wetas (Deinacrida heteracantha) are known, the elephant beetles of Central and South America, (Megasoma elephas) and (M. actaeon), the Titan beetle (Titanus giganteus) of the neotropical rainforest or the Goliath beetles, (Goliathus goliatus) and (G. regius), of Africa's rainforest are thought to reach a higher weight.

Some moths and butterflies have much larger areas than the heaviest beetles, but weigh a fraction as much.

The longest insects are the stick insects, see below.

Representatives of the extinct dragonfly-like order Meganisoptera, such as the Carboniferous Meganeura monyi of what is now France and the Permian Meganeuropsis permiana of what is now North America, are the largest insect species known to have existed.

Cockroaches and termites (Blattodea)

The largest cockroach by body mass is the Australian giant burrowing cockroach (Macropanesthia rhinoceros), also known as the rhinoceros cockroach. It does not have wings. The Brazilian giant cockroach (Blaberus giganteus) of the neotropics reaches greater sizes of up to 10 cm in length and 15 cm in wingspan, although it is not as massive and heavy as the burrowing species. The termites, traditionally classified in their own order (Isoptera), have recently been re-considered to belong in Blattodea. The largest of the termites is the African species Macrotermes bellicosus.
Beetles (Coleoptera)
The beetles are the largest order of organisms on earth, with about 400,000 species so far identified. The most massive species are the Goliathus, Megasoma and Titanus beetles already mentioned. Another fairly large species is the Hercules beetle (Dynastes hercules) of the neotropic rainforest with a maximum overall length of at least  including the extremely long pronotal horn. The weight in this species does not exceed .
Earwigs (Dermaptera)
As of 2014, with the declaring of the organism extinct by the IUCN, this may no longer be the case, although some believe a small number individuals are still extant.
True flies (Diptera)

Species of crane fly, the largest of which is Holorusia brobdignagius, can attain a length of  but are extremely slender and much lighter in weight than Gauromydas.
Mayflies (Ephemeroptera)
The largest mayflies are members of the genus Proboscidoplocia from Madagascar.
True bugs (Hemiptera)

The largest species of this diverse order is usually listed as the giant water bug in the genus Lethocerus, with L. maximus from the Neotropics being the absolutely largest. It is more slender and less heavy than most other insects of this size (principally the huge beetles). The cicadas of the genus Tacua can also grow to comparably large sizes.
Ants and allies (Hymenoptera)
The giant scarab-hunting wasp Megascolia procer may rival the largest tarantula hawks in weight and wingspan, though its body is not as long.
Moths and allies (Lepidoptera)
The largest species overall is often claimed to be either the Queen Alexandra's birdwing (Ornithoptera alexandrae), a butterfly from Papua New Guinea, or the Atlas moth (Attacus atlas), a moth from Southeast Asia. One Atlas moth allegedly had a wingspan of  but this measurement was not verified. However, there are no reported measurements of surface area that would exceed the Hercules moth, and the white witch (Thysania agrippina) of Central and South America, has the largest recorded wingspan of the order, and indeed of any living insect, though the white witch is exceeded in surface area by the Hercules moth. The heaviest mature moths have been cited in the giant carpenter moth (Xyleutes boisduvali) of Australia, which has weighed up to  although the species does not surpass  in wingspan.
Mantises (Mantodea)
However, an undescribed species from the Cameroon jungle is allegedly much larger than any other mantis and may rival the larger stick insects for the longest living insect. Among widespread mantis species, the largest is the Chinese mantis (Tenodera aridifolia).
Scorpionflies (Mecoptera)
Alderflies and allies (Megaloptera)
This relatively small insect order includes some rather large species, many of which are noticeable for their elongated, imposing mandibles.
Net-winged insects (Neuroptera)

Some forms of this ancient order could grow extremely large during the Jurassic period and may have ranked among the largest insects ever.
Dragonflies (Odonata)
Grasshoppers and allies (Orthoptera)

The largest of this widespread, varied complex of insects are the giant wetas of New Zealand, which is now split among 12 species.
Stick insects (Phasmatodea)
The longest known stick insects are also the longest known insects, notably species in the tribe Pharnaciini, but they are generally relatively lightweight because of their slender shape. Another extremely long stick insect is Pharnacia maxima, which measured  with its legs extended.
Lice (Phthiraptera)
These insects, which live parasitically on other animals, are as a rule quite small. The largest known species is the hog louse, Haematopinus suis, a sucking louse that lives on large livestock like pigs and cattle.
Stoneflies (Plecoptera)
The largest species of stonefly is Pteronarcys californica of western North America, a species favored by fishermen as lures.
Booklice (Psocoptera)
The largest of this order of very small insects are the barklice of the genus Psocus, the top size of which is about 1 cm.
Fleas (Siphonaptera)
The largest species of flea is Hystrichopsylla schefferi.
Silverfishes and allies (Thysanura)

Thrips (Thysanoptera)
Members of the genus Phasmothrips are the largest kinds of thrips.
Caddisflies (Trichoptera)
The largest of the small, moth-like caddisflies is Eubasilissa maclachlani.
Angel insects (Zoraptera)

Cnidarians (Cnidaria)

The lion's mane jellyfish (Cyanea capillata) is the largest cnidarian species, of the class Scyphozoa.

Corals and sea anemones (Anthozoa)
Hydrozoans (Hydrozoa)
On April 6, 2020 the Schmidt Ocean Institute announced the discovery of a giant Apolemia siphonophore in submarine canyons near Ningaloo Coast, measuring 15 m (49 ft) diameter with a ring approximately 47 m (154 ft) long, claiming it was possibly the largest siphonophore ever recorded.

Sponges (Porifera)

The largest known species of sea sponge is the giant barrel sponge, Xestospongia muta. These massively built sponges can reach  in height and can be about the same thickness at the thickest part of the "body". Some of these creatures have been estimated to be over 2,400 years of age.
Calcareous sponges (Calcarea)
Hexactinellid sponges (Hexactinellida)
A relatively common species, Rhabdocalyptus dawsoni, can reach a height of  once they are of a very old age. This is the maximum size recorded for a hexactinellid sponge.

See also
 Largest prehistoric animals
 Megafauna
 Largest organisms

References

Animals

Heaviest or most massive organisms